Private Equity News is a Europe-based business magazine about the private equity industry. It is part of media organisation Dow Jones & Co, itself part of News Corp, and is a sister title to Financial News, Private Equity Analyst and The Wall Street Journal.

The magazine and its website have been running since 2003 and hold various events. In 2022 the title relaunched as a monthly magazine, where previously it had been published weekly.

References

External links
 Private Equity News website

Business magazines published in the United Kingdom
Weekly magazines published in the United Kingdom
Magazines published in London
Magazines established in 2003
Private equity media and publications